Debra Willcox (born September 16, 1959) is an American gymnast. She competed in six events at the 1976 Summer Olympics.

References

External links
 

1959 births
Living people
American female artistic gymnasts
Olympic gymnasts of the United States
Gymnasts at the 1976 Summer Olympics
Sportspeople from Denver
Pan American Games medalists in gymnastics
Pan American Games gold medalists for the United States
Pan American Games silver medalists for the United States
Gymnasts at the 1975 Pan American Games
21st-century American women
20th-century American women